Qikiqtaalujjuaq (Inuktitut syllabics: ᕿᑭᖅᑖᓗᔾᔪᐊᖅ) formerly Glencoe Island is a Canadian Arctic island located in Hudson Strait. It is a Baffin Island offshore island in Nunavut's Qikiqtaaluk Region.

The Strathcona Islands and Spicer Islands are close by. Kimmirut, an Inuit hamlet, is to the east.

References

Islands of Baffin Island
Islands of Hudson Strait
Uninhabited islands of Qikiqtaaluk Region